Adashev (masculine) or Adasheva (feminine) is a Russian last name.

There are three theories regarding the origins of this last name. The most plausible one relates it to a Turkic word adaš, meaning namesake, comrade, friend. It is also possible that this last name derives from nickname "" (Adash), itself derived from a Vologda and Yaroslavl dialectal word "" (adat), meaning to cry, to yell. Finally, it could have developed from the diminutive forms of the Christian first names Adrian and Adam.

People with the last name
Alexey Adashev, friend of Tsar Ivan the Terrible involved in the creation of the Illustrated Chronicle of Ivan the Terrible
Rajab Adashev, who starred in Abdullajon, a 1991 Uzbek science fiction comedy
Zarrukh Adashev, Uzbek mixed martial artist

See also
Adashevo, several rural localities in Russia

References

Notes

Sources
И. М. Ганжина (I. M. Ganzhina). "Словарь современных русских фамилий" (Dictionary of Modern Russian Last Names). Москва, 2001. 



Russian-language surnames